Beyl Head is an ice-covered headland midway on the east side of Wright Island, along Getz Ice Shelf, Bakutis Coast. It was named by the Advisory Committee on Antarctic Names in 1977 after Commander David D. Beyl, U.S. Navy, Operations Officer, Operation Deepfreeze 1976, with responsibility for planning the Dome Charlie aircraft recovery program which resulted in the successful recovery of two LC-130 aircraft damaged during Operation Deepfreeze 1975. That he was the namesake of a landmass on Antarctica was not known to Beyl for many decades.

References

 

Headlands of Marie Byrd Land